Pentanema spiraeifolium is a species perennial herbaceous plant belonging to the family Asteraceae. It is found from Europe to Iran.

Description
The base of the leaves is not embracing the stem. The upper cauline leaves are erect, with a round base. The stem is erect and branched, with numerous flowers (two to twelve). The outer ones are ligulate and bright yellow, while the inner ones are tubular dark orange. The flower's attachment to the stalk (receptacle) is covered by clearly curved scales. The flowering period extends from June to August.

Distribution
This plant is found in southern France, Italy, Switzerland, and the Balkans.

Habitat

References

External links

Czech Botany, Biolib
Zipcode Zoo, Inula

spiraeifolia
Flora of Europe
Plants described in 1759